Randall Cobb may refer to:

Randall "Tex" Cobb (born 1950), American fighter/actor
Randall Cobb (American football) (born 1990), American football player